Carlos Alan Autry Jr. (also known for a time as Carlos Brown; born July 31, 1952), is an American actor, politician, and former National Football League (NFL) player. During his brief football career, he was known as Carlos Brown. 

Autry played the role of Captain Bubba Skinner on the NBC, and later CBS, television drama series In the Heat of the Night, starring Carroll O'Connor. He has also appeared in films and other television shows. In November 2000, he was elected mayor of Fresno, California, and served for two four-year terms through January 2009.  From 2008 to 2011, Autry hosted a talk radio show on KYNO AM 940 in Fresno.  He now hosts a midday show on KXEX 1550 AM in Fresno.

Early life

Autry was born in Shreveport, Louisiana, the son of Carl and Verna (née Brown) Autry. His name was changed to Carlos Brown when he was a year old, after his parents divorced. He worked alongside his mother and stepfather, Joe Duty, in California's San Joaquin Valley, where they planted and harvested cotton, grapes, and other crops, traveling around the valley living in migrant worker camps. When he was twelve, they settled in Riverdale, California.

Football career
In high school, Autry was a star quarterback for the Riverdale Cowboys. He received an athletic scholarship to the University of the Pacific in Stockton, California, where he was a second-string tight end in his senior year for the Tigers. In 1975, he was drafted by the Green Bay Packers, where he ended up in 1976, as the starting quarterback for three games.

His football career ended quickly when he was cut from the team by then-coach Bart Starr. Autry then went to Hollywood to become an actor. He made a football comeback attempt, playing for the B.C. Lions of the CFL in 1979 (as Carlos Brown). He was the third-string quarterback behind Joe Paopao and another ex-Green Bay Packer, Jerry Tagge.

Acting career

Autry made his film debut in the 1978 motion picture Remember My Name. He met his father, Carl Autry Sr., for the first time in 1981, while on location in Shreveport for the motion picture Southern Comfort, after he found Carl's name in the telephone book. Afterwards, he made the decision to return to his birth surname of Autry. During his acting years, he struggled with drug and alcohol use, according to an interview with Pat Robertson's The 700 Club in 2007.

Other
After nine years in Hollywood, Autry returned home and left his career. "I realized that God had moved in my life like never before. I really realized what God and the power of Jesus Christ was," he said on The 700 Club. 
By 1986, he was divorced and became a born-again Christian and began to devote much of his time to working with charitable causes. He is married to his second wife, Kimberlee Autry; the couple has three children.

Filmography

Television

Starring roles
In the Heat of the Night (1988–95) as Officer/Sergeant/Lieutenant/Captain Bubba Skinner
Grace Under Fire (1995–96) as Rick Bradshaw
Style & Substance (1998) as Earl
Sons of Thunder (1999) as Butch McMann

Guest-starring roles
Hello, Larry – "The Final Papers" (1979) as Max [credited as Carlos Brown]
Seven Brides for Seven Brothers – "Gold Fever" (1982) as J.T. [credited as Carlos Brown]
Best of the West – "The Funeral" (1982) [credited as Carlos Brown]
Cheers – "The Boys in the Bar" (1983) as Tom Kenderson
The Mississippi – "Murder at Mt. Parnassus" (1983)
The A-Team
 "Labor Pains" (1983) as Gary Crenshaw
 "Quarterback Sneak" (1986) as Mike "The Hammer" Horn
The Dukes of Hazzard
 "Dr. Jekyll and Mr. Duke" (1984) as Hurley
 "10 Million Dollar Sheriff" (Parts 1&2) (1981) as Dawson [credited as Carlos Brown]
Hunter – "High Bleacher Man" (1984) as Whitey McVee
Newhart – "Will the Real Dick Loudon Please Shut Up?" (1986) as Ed McKendrick
St. Elsewhere – "Out on a Limb" (1986) as John Corzinsky
The Facts of Life – "Peekskill Law" (1988) as Clark Darrin
Hart of Dixie (2015) – as Mayor Todd Gainey Sr. of rival town Fillmore, AL
Tulsa King (2022) - as Brian Gillen

Appearances
26th Annual Academy of Country Music Awards (1991) as himself/presenting
George & Alana (1995) as himself (interview)
30th Annual Victor Awards (1996) as himself/presenting
34th Annual Academy of Country Music Awards (1999) as himself/presenting
Get Away Right Away Child Safety Video (1999) as himself/host
Billy Graham Central Valley Crusade (2001) as himself
California 911 Memorial Video (2001) as himself (Master of Ceremonies)
CNN'S Lou Dobbs Tonight (6/2/05) as himself (interview)
Hannity & Colmes (6/10/05) as himself (interview)
Praise the Lord
 (April 6, 2006) as himself (interview)
 (January 2003) as himself (interview)
 (March 2003) as himself (interview)
 (March 2004) as himself (guest host)
Newshour with Jim Lehrer (July 28, 2006) as himself (interview)
The 700 Club (January 9, 2006) as himself (interview)

Films
Credited as Alan Autry
Roadhouse 66 (1984) as Hoot
O.C. and Stiggs (1985)
The Eagle and the Bear (1985)
Brewster's Millions (1985) as Biff Brown
Nomads (1986) as Olds
House (1986) as Cop #3
Blue de Ville (1986) as Sgt. Auggie Johnson
At Close Range (1986) as Ernie
Proud Men (1987) as Brian Winoon
Destination America (1987) as Larry Leathergood
Amazing Grace and Chuck (1987) as George
World Gone Wild (1987) as Hank
Street of Dreams (1988) as Maury Fields
The Big One: The Great Los Angeles Earthquake (1990) as Matt
Intruders (1992) as Joe Wilkes
The Legend of Jake Kincaid (2002) as Jake Kincaid
Forgiven (2011) as Jake Kincaid
Victory by Submission (2016) as Hank Hendricks

Credited as Carlos Brown
Remember My Name (1978) as Rusty
North Dallas Forty (1979) as Balford
Rage! (1980) as Man #B
Popeye (1980) as Slug (a bully)
Southern Comfort (1981) as Cpl. Nolan (Coach) Bowden
Dangerous Company (1982) as Donald Robinette

Politics

Autry, a Republican, was elected in 2000 to succeed Jim Patterson as the mayor of Fresno, defeating former mayor Dan Whitehurst. He was elected to a second term (2005-2009) on March 2, 2004, with more than 72 percent of the vote. Because of term limits, he was ineligible to run for re-election. In November 2008, he endorsed Ashley Swearengin, who was elected to succeed him as mayor.

Dirt Road Productions
In 1997, Autry launched his own production company, Dirt Road Productions. In 2002, he released The Legend of Jake Kincaid, a Western based on a story he wrote. He was also the director of this film.

Music

Autry and his In the Heat of the Night co-star Randall Franks joined forces under the banner of Autry-Franks Productions to produce the charity In the Heat of the Night CD Christmas Time's A Comin''', featuring the cast of the show. The project raised funds for drug abuse prevention charities. With Franks producing, Autry performed his rendition of "Rudolph the Red-Nosed Reindeer" in homage to Gene Autry.  (Gene and Alan were distant cousins, descended from William A. Autry (5 August 1784 – 2 April 1836) and Mary Campbell of North Carolina/Tennessee.)

Franks and Autry both performed on "Jingle Bells" and "Christmas Time's A Comin'". The duo were able to include many music legends, including Kitty Wells, Jimmy Dickens, and Pee Wee King, and many from the bluegrass genre, from Jim & Jesse to The Lewis Family. The Christmas Time's A Comin' CD, released on Sonlite and MGM/UA, was one of the most popular Christmas releases of 1991 and 1992 with Southern retailers.

Crimson Records released their second Autry-Franks Productions project Alan Autry and Randall Franks Mississippi Moon: Country Traditions'' in 2013, an Americana CD featuring both actors vocally on various classic and original songs. The project, which incorporates country, bluegrass and Southern gospel, includes special appearances by Bluegrass Hall of Fame members Jim and Jesse McReynolds and three-time Dove Award nominee Mark Wheeler of the Marksmen Quartet.

Electoral history

References

https://www.pro-football-reference.com/players/B/BrowCa00.htm

External links
 
 
 
 Just Sports Stats

1952 births
Living people
American actor-politicians
American athlete-politicians
American male film actors
American male television actors
American football quarterbacks
California Republicans
Green Bay Packers players
Louisiana Republicans
Mayors of Fresno, California
Pacific Tigers football players
Players of American football from Shreveport, Louisiana
Actors from Shreveport, Louisiana
University of the Pacific (United States) alumni